Muriel Lilah Matters (12 November 1877 – 17 November 1969) was an Australian-born suffragist, lecturer, journalist, educator, actress and elocutionist. Based in Britain from 1905 until her death, Matters is best known for her work on behalf of the Women's Freedom League at the height of the militant struggle to enfranchise women in the United Kingdom.

Early life
Muriel Matters was born in the inner city suburb of Bowden in Adelaide, South Australia, to a large Methodist family. Her mother, Emma Alma Matters (née Warburton), gave birth to five daughters and five sons, with Muriel being the third oldest child. Her father was John Leonard Matters, a cabinetmaker and later stockbroker.

Matters spent the majority of her youth in South Australia. In 1894 the colony had gained attention for being the first self-governing territory to give women equal franchise on the same terms as it was granted to men, under legislation passed by the Kingston Government.

During Matters' upbringing she was introduced to two 19th-century literary figures who proved influential in informing her political consciousness. These were the American poet Walt Whitman and the Norwegian playwright Henrik Ibsen, author of A Doll's House. While attending elocution classes as a child, the works of both of these writers featured prominently.

Matters studied music at the University of Adelaide and by the late 1890s had begun to act and conduct recitals, initially in Adelaide, but later in Sydney and Melbourne with the Robert Brough Company.

At the time of the Federation of Australia in 1901, Matters returned to Adelaide and taught elocution while concurrently performing for audiences at numerous halls and saloons across the state. In 1904, she left Adelaide once more to join her family who in the meantime had moved to Perth, Western Australia. In Perth she continued her acting and was encouraged by friends in the industry to further her career in London. She soon followed their advice and, in late 1905, aged 28, Matters boarded the passenger ship Persic to travel to London, England.

Conversion to the suffrage cause

When Matters arrived in London she began doing recitals intermittently and eventually performed at the Bechstein Hall (now named Wigmore Hall). However, recital work in London was difficult to acquire due to a surplus of performers and Matters undertook occasional work as a journalist for income. As a journalist she is known to have interviewed George Bernard Shaw and the exiled anarchist Prince Peter Kropotkin. Matters eventually performed at the home of Kropotkin and, after her recital, he challenged her to use her skills for something more useful stating that, "Art is not an end of life, but a means." Matters agreed with his assessment and soon became involved with the Women's Freedom League (WFL) to further the cause of women. She would later write that her encounter with Kropotkin, "proved to be the lifetime in a moment lived – my entire mental outlook was changed." WFL was led by Charlotte Despard and was set up to be more democratic than the Pankhursts led Women's Social and Political Union (WSPU) suffragettes. Matters accompanied Maud Arncliffe Sennet to an event where Milicent Fawcett was debating the support for women's militancy  Arncliffe Sennett wrote in the press that Matters had not been forced into silence.

Work with the Women's Freedom League

Caravan tour of 1908

In early May through to mid-October 1908, Matters was "Organiser in Charge" of the first "Votes for Women" caravan that toured the south east counties of England. The caravan tour began in Oxshott and passed through Surrey, Sussex, East Anglia and Kent. The purpose of the tour was to speak about women's enfranchisement and establish new WFL branches in the region. Despite the occasional heckler, Matters and the others involved, such as Charlotte Despard and Amy Hicks, were successful in achieving these aims and established several branches. On this tour Matters met a young Quaker named Violet Tillard in Tunbridge Wells who remained a close acquaintance until Tillard's death in 1922, which was due to typhus contracted while helping people in famine-ravaged Russia.

Grille incident
On the night of 28 October 1908, the WFL conducted a simultaneous protest at the British Houses of Parliament. It was to occur outside St Stephen's Entrance, the Old Prison Yard and in the House of Commons. The purpose of the protest was to raise attention to the struggle of women and remove the "grille", a piece of ironwork placed in the Ladies' Gallery that obscured their view of parliamentary proceedings. Matters was at the heart of the protest at this symbol of women's oppression. She and an associate, Helen Fox, both chained themselves to the grille of the Ladies' Gallery and Matters began loudly proclaiming the benefits of enfranchisement directly to the elected MPs. 

Although not recorded in Hansard, the official minute of the House of Commons, Matters pronouncements were technically the first woman's speech ever in the British Parliament.

Meanwhile, Violet Tillard lowered a proclamation to the politicians below using pieces of string and a man from the Stranger's Gallery threw handbills onto the floor of Parliament. The police soon seized all the people involved but could not separate Matters and Fox from the grille. Eventually the grille was removed completely with the women attached and, once escorted to a nearby committee room, a blacksmith was fetched to detach the women from the ironwork. Not charged over the incident, Matters and the other women involved were soon released near St Stephen's Entrance where they rejoined other members of the WFL who were still protesting. It was here that Matters was arrested on a "trumped-up charge of obstruction" trying to rush the Parliament's lobby. The following day, 14 women (including Matters) and one man were tried at the Westminster Police Court. Matters was found guilty of wilfully obstructing London Police and was sentenced to one months imprisonment to be served at Holloway Gaol.

Airship flight

On 16 February 1909, King Edward officially opened Parliament for the coming year. As a part of the occasion, there was a procession to the Houses of Parliament led by the King. To gain attention and to promote the suffrage cause, Matters decided to hire a small dirigible airship (similar to a modern-day blimp in appearance) owned by Percival G. Spencer and intended to shower the King and the Houses of Parliament with WFL pamphlets. However, due to adverse wind conditions and the rudimentary motor powering the airship, she never made it to the Palace of Westminster. Instead, Matters, beginning at Hendon airfields, hugged the outskirts of London flying over Wormwood Scrubs, Kensington, Tooting and finally landing in Coulsdon with the trip lasting an hour and a half in total.

Matters scattered  of handbills promoting the WFL's cause and leading members of the league, Edith How-Martyn and Elsie Craig, pursued her by car. Her flight made headlines around the world.

1910: First lecture tour of Australia
Before sailing to Australia, Matters and fellow suffragette Violet Tillard, helped the Women's Freedom League campaign in Liverpool from January to April 1910, and she spoke with Amy Sanderson and Emma Sproson at a mass gathering in Trafalgar Square in April. From May to July 1910, Matters gave lectures focused on her experiences in Britain agitating for change. In the four-month tour, she spoke in Perth (Literary Hall), Adelaide (Town Hall), Melbourne (Princess Theatre) and Sydney (King's Hall). Giving three talks in each city she advocated for prison reform, equal pay for equal work and for the vote to be granted to the women of Great Britain. Accompanied by Violet Tillard on the tour, Matters presented the audience with illustrations related to the movement and donned a facsimile of her prison dress. From the newspaper reports surrounding her visit it is evident that she played to sizeable audiences and that her performances were littered with laughter and applause.

At the conclusion of the lecture tour, Matters helped Vida Goldstein secure an Australian Senate resolution that outlined the country's positive experiences with women's suffrage. The resolution was passed and sent to Prime Minister Asquith in Britain.

Work in East London

Within a year of Matters' return from her country of origin, she became involved with the "Mothers Arms" project in East London led by Sylvia Pankhurst. Matters and other concerned women worked with poor children and mothers residing in the slums of Lambeth, London. With the help of others, she educated impoverished children in the Montessori method in addition to feeding and clothing them. During 1913 Matters ensured that the male dominated National Federation of Mineworkers came to support women's suffrage.

Work in Scotland 
During 1913, Matters spent much time campaigning for the suffrage cause in Scotland. For example, in January, she spoke in the Livingstone Hall in Edinburgh on the subject of the Reform Bill. In April, Matters spoke at a number of suffrage meetings in East Fife. In Newhaven, the meeting was chaired by Alice Low, who also spoke at meetings alongside Matters in Armadale and Bathgate (West Lothian)  later that year during a local by-election. A letter by Matters in The Scotsman (published in April) denounced forcible feeding and the Cat and Mouse Act .

Matters was presented with a most unusual souvenir after a meeting in Perth, Tayside in May: amongst the missiles thrown at her was a hambone, and this was later inscribed 'N.U.W.S.S., Perth 20-6-13' and presented to her. Dr Elsie Inglis presided over a meeting when Matters was the speaker in Edinburgh in November 1913. In December, Matters spoke in Nairn on the subject of 'women in social and political evolution'. Matters made a number of other appearances in Scotland in the first six months of 1914; for instance in Musselburgh in June where she dealt 'most effectively' with the subject of women's suffrage.

Marriage

In September 1913, Matters became engaged to marry William Arnold Porter, a divorced Bostonian dentist, at the fourth time of asking. In those days it was controversial to marry a divorcee, and rumour was he had left his wife for her. The couple married on 15 October 1914. She subsequently became known as Muriel Matters-Porter. The couple did not have children.

Objection to the First World War

In June 1915, one year after the outbreak of World War I, Matters declared her opposition to the war in an address entitled "The False Mysticism of War". In essence, she argued that war is not a successful problem solving mechanism and justifications for war are based on false pretences. She expressed her displeasure at Christianity being used as a justification of war as the origins of the faith made no appeal to armed force. For Matters, those advocating war in government along theological lines could not be trusted, "For their god is in their own consciousness, a magnified edition of themselves." Furthermore, in her address she provides a rebuttal of the militaristic arguments presented in the book War and the World's Life by Colonel Frederic Natusch Maude. Matters also questioned the importance of nationality – the rise of which being a central factor in the outbreak of the war she was denouncing. With the newspapers of the day filled with honour rolls of dead soldiers and advertisements to purchase war bonds, her arguments were in conflict with a society engaged in total war. The address was later reproduced in the form of a pamphlet by the anti-war Peace Committee of the Society of Friends (Quakers) and sold for a small fee.

Montessori method

In 1916, Matters spent a year in Barcelona attending the Italian educator Maria Montessori's international course which focused on new educational strategies, looking at the whole child's development: physical, social, emotional and cognitive. Spain's neutrality during the Great War allowed Matters to go there to study the child-centred approach to learning taught by Montessori, which fitted her view that education should be a universal right. On her return to England she resumed work with the poor children of East London and, on occasion, was invited to lecture education students in England and Scotland on the merits of the Montessori method.

1922: Second lecture tour of Australia

In 1922, Matters undertook a second lecture tour of Australia but this time her primary concern was to advocate Montessori's ideas to the educators of her native country. Giving lectures in Perth, Sydney, Adelaide and Melbourne, her tour was closely followed by the Australian press.

Candidate for Hastings

Returning to the UK, Matters was selected to run as the Labour Party candidate for the seat of Hastings in the General Election of 1924. Her opponent was the incumbent Conservative candidate, Lord Eustace Percy. She ran on a largely socialist platform advocating a fairer distribution of wealth, work for the unemployed and furthering the equality of the sexes. During the election, Muriel's younger brother, Leonard Matters, joined her on the campaign. Leonard's experience as a writer and journalist would have been invaluable in negotiating the hostile Hastings press (Leonard himself would later become the Member for Lambeth in 1929). Despite the Matters’ best efforts, Lord Eustace Percy was returned with an increased majority of 9,135 which echoed the Conservative gains across the country.

Hastings remained a safe Conservative seat and was not claimed by a Labour Party candidate until 1997.

Later life and death

In the years after the election, Matters settled in Hastings with her husband. It was 1928, when a fifty-one-year-old Matters finally achieved what she and other women of Great Britain were seeking -  equal suffrage for women compared to men (partial suffrage had been granted to women in 1918). In her later years, Matters often wrote letters to the editor of newspapers, frequented the local library and was heavily involved in the Hastings community. Controversial to the end, she was locally reported as seen "skinny dipping" at Pelham Beach.

Widowed in 1949, Matters died 21 years later on 17 November 1969, aged 92, at the St Leonards on Sea nursing home.

Recognition 
Matters was not given the same recognition in Australia as in the UK, where she was interviewed by the BBC in 1939.  But in 2009 the Muriel Matters Society was set up. In 2013, a docu-drama called Muriel Matters! was presented at the Adelaide Film Festival and on   ABC TV. In 2018 a street mural of Matters appeared in Adelaide and an article about her linked the battles she fought to the #MeToo movement. In 2021, the South Australian Minister for Education and Speaker of the House of Assembly instituted the Muriel Matters Award, for South Australian secondary school students who show self-initiative and commitment to making a difference in the community.

See also
 Women's suffrage in the United Kingdom

References

Further reading

External links
 
 Muriel Matters: The daring Australian suffragist who spurred a 'MeToo moment in British history'
 The Muriel Matters Society Inc.
 Oxford Dictionary of National Biography entry
 Brief biography on the Hastings Women's Suffrage website

1877 births
1969 deaths
Actresses from Adelaide
Australian suffragists
Australian feminist writers
Australian journalists
Australian educators
20th-century Australian actresses
Australian socialist feminists
Labour Party (UK) parliamentary candidates
Elocutionists